The 1969 Australian Sports Car Championship was a CAMS sanctioned Australian motor racing title open to Group A Sports Cars, Group B Improved Production Sports Cars and Group D Series Production Sports Cars. It was the inaugural Australian Sports Car Championship, replacing the Australian Tourist Trophy as Australia's premier Sports Car contest.

The championship was won by Frank Matich driving a Matich SR4 Repco.

Schedule
The championship was contested over three heats with one race per heat.

Points system
Championship points were awarded on a 9-6-4-3-2-1 basis to the first six placegetters at each heat.

Results

References

External links
 1969 Australian Sports Car racing images from www.autopics.com.au

Australian Sports Car Championship
Sports Car Championship